German submarine U-524 was a Type IXC U-boat of Nazi Germany's Kriegsmarine during World War II.

She was laid down at the Deutsche Werft (yard) in Hamburg as yard number 339 on 7 August 1941, launched on 30 April 1942 and commissioned on 8 July with Kapitänleutnant Walter Freiherr von Steinaecker in command.

U-524 began her service career with training as part of the 4th U-boat Flotilla from 8 July 1942. She was reassigned to the 10th flotilla for operations on 1 December 1942.

She carried out two patrols and sank two ships. She was a member of three wolfpacks.

She was sunk on 22 March 1943 in south of Madeira by an American aircraft.

Design
German Type IXC submarines were slightly larger than the original Type IXBs. U-524 had a displacement of  when at the surface and  while submerged. She had two shafts and two  propellers.

U-524 was fitted with six  torpedo tubes (four fitted at the bow and two at the stern), 22 torpedoes, one  SK C/32 naval gun, 180 rounds, and a  SK C/30 as well as a  C/30 anti-aircraft gun. The boat had a complement of forty-eight.

Service history

First patrol
The boat departed Marviken (Kristiansand) in Norway on 14 November 1942, moved through the North Sea, negotiated the gap between Iceland and the Faroe Islands and entered the Atlantic Ocean.

She opened her account when she sank the Empire Spenser on 8 December 1942 southeast of Cape Farewell (Greenland).

She entered Lorient, on the French Atlantic coast, on 9 January 1943.

Second patrol and loss
Having left Lorient on 3 March 1943, she sank the French ship Wyoming on the 15th, north of the Azores.

She was sunk south of Madeira on the 22nd by depth charges dropped by an American B-24 Liberator called Tidewater Tillie.

Fifty-two men died; there were no survivors.

Wolfpacks
U-524 took part in three wolfpacks, namely:
 Panzer (23 November – 11 December 1942) 
 Ungestüm (11 – 23 December 1942) 
 Wohlgemut (12 – 22 March 1943)

Summary of raiding history

References

Bibliography

External links

German Type IX submarines
U-boats commissioned in 1942
U-boats sunk in 1943
World War II submarines of Germany
1942 ships
World War II shipwrecks in the Atlantic Ocean
Ships built in Hamburg
U-boats sunk by US aircraft
U-boats sunk by depth charges
Ships lost with all hands
Maritime incidents in March 1943